Barry Conners (1883–1933) was an American actor, screenwriter and playwright. An established writer for the stage, he was employed in Hollywood during the final few years of life during the early sound era.

Selected filmography
 The Patsy (1928)
 Charlie Chan Carries On (1931)
 The Black Camel (1931)
 The Spider (1931)
 There Were Thirteen (1931)
 Riders of the Purple Sage (1931)
 Women of All Nations (1931)
 Bachelor's Affairs (1932)
 Chandu the Magician (1932)
 Charlie Chan's Chance (1932)
 Hat Check Girl (1932)
 Me and My Gal (1932)
 The Gay Caballero (1932)
 The Rainbow Trail (1932)
 The Trial of Vivienne Ware (1932)
 Too Busy to Work (1932 film) (1932)
 Hot Pepper (1933)
 Pilgrimage (1933)
 Brides Are Like That (1936)
 Always a Bride (1940)

References

Bibliography
 Aubrey Solomon. The Fox Film Corporation, 1915-1935: A History and Filmography''. McFarland, 2011.

External links

1883 births
1933 deaths
American male stage actors
20th-century American screenwriters
20th-century American male writers